Sihwei Elementary School is a metro station on the Green Line operated by Taichung Metro in Beitun District, Taichung, Taiwan.

The station name is taken from the nearby Sihwei Elementary School, and is the only station name in the network to use Tongyong Pinyin.

Station layout

References 

Taichung Metro
Railway stations in Taichung
Railway stations opened in 2020